Doin' It Big is the second studio album of Filipino artist Young JV. It was released on August 29, 2012.  This was his first album to be released under Star Records and Doin' It Big Productions. in CD and through digital download on iTunes, amazon.com, starrecords.com.ph, and the official nationwide music downloading cite in the country, mymusicstore.com.ph.

The album features ten original tracks in total. It was promoted by three singles, including hit songs "Alay" and lead single "Your Name".  After the success of the lead single, "Tanong" was released as the third single.

Background
It was reported by a publishing cite in the Philippines, philSTAR.com, that there will be lots more of his originals and star-powered collaborations in the new album. Among these are tracks with Yeng Constantino, Karylle and Akiko Solon. The latter is Alay, or offering, a song about unconditional love that is ideal for this Christmas Season. It is accompanied with a music video that began airing in late November 2011. This made a mark of idea to fans about the concept (of his second album) in which being distant from his 2009 album, Ready Or Not.

The album in this new recording label is extra-special for him as it presents the listeners everything that he can do as an artist. "We worked on it for a year and we basically did a lot of styles of music that the youth and young adults will surely appreciate–from hip hop, R&B, acoustic, house, and more. And through it, I was able to shows my different emotions," according to Young JV. Further, he is a stickler for writing original music, unlike some of his fellow artists, who are doing remakes of classic OPM hits. He also added when he is writing a song, “two to three week-long process.”

Doin' It Big was launched at noon-time musical variety show, ASAP on 29 October. After that, it was followed-up of several mall shows across his country home, the Philippines, to promote the album.

Singles 
"Alay" was the first single from the album and was released on November 25, 2011. It features singer Akiko. An accompanying music video was officially released on December 25. The version featured on the album had a different beat at the beginning.

"Your Name" was released on October 4, 2012, and is considered to be the lead single of the album. It features singer and actress, Myrtle Sarrosa, who won the fourth season of Pinoy Big Brother: Teen Edition. It was later used as the theme song for the romantic comedy movie 24/7 in Love.

"Tanong" was released on January 5, 2013. It is considered as the second single but is the third overall release from the album. It is a love song in midtempo, done acoustically. Young JV stated in an interview with Manila Bulletin, that he wanted to distance himself from "being just a hip hop, rap and R&B artist". A music video was released on March 18. To promote the single, Young JV appeared on an episode of ASAP which was held on Capiz Gym, Villareal Stadium, Roxas City, on the date of its release. He performed the song with Yeng Constantino.

"Ngiti" was released on August 25, 2013, as the fourth single included on the album's repackaged version titled, Doin' It Big: Platinum Edition. It features singer Gary Valenciano. JV and Valenciano performed the song for the first time at the noontime musical variety show ASAP 18 during the same day of its release on August 25, 2013. A different version of the song was later included on Valenciano's album, With You, which was released on February 11, 2014. In this album, Valenciano's vocals are more prominent than JV's.

"Get Up And Dance" is the fifth and last single off the album. It was released on August 2, 2014 which uploaded and announced through Facebook account of the singer. The music video of the said single premiered on 09/30/14 in his YouTube channel directed by Nolan Bernardino.

Track listing

Doin' It Big 

Notes
 Track 4, "Your Name" is the theme song of the film 24/7 In Love.
 Track 8, "Alay" translated in English as sacrifice or offering.
 Track 11, "Pinas" translated in English as the Philippines

Personnel
 Malou N. Santos – executive producer
 Roxy Liquigan – executive producer
 EAK of DOIN' IT BIG Productions Inc. – executive producer
 Jonathan Manalo – A&R Manager
 Bojam of Flipmusic – co-producer
 Bojam and Thyro of Flipmusic – sound editors
 Roxy Liquigan – star adprom head
 Joel Ramos – music marketing and promotions strategies
 Gina Mauricio-Joyce - promo supervisor
 Zyra Cuenco – promo specialist
 Marivic Benedicto – star songs. inc. and new media head
 Beth Faustino – music publishing officer
 Abegail Aledo – music servicing coordinator
 Eaizen Almazan – new media technical assistant
 Regie Sandel – sales and distribution officer
 Andrew Castillo – creative head of album layout and design
 Xander Angeles – photographer
 Robert Dela Cruz – hair and make-up artist
 Joseph Robert Espiritu – stylist

Certifications

References

2012 albums
Young JV albums